Free People's Party may refer to:

Free People's Party (Germany), 1956-1957
Farmers' Party (Denmark), initially called the Free People's Party